Georgian Museum of Fine Arts is a private art museum located on the Rustaveli Avenue in Tbilisi, Georgia (country). The construction broke ground in 2013 and is the only building in Georgia built purposely to house art exhibitions. The museum official opening was held on September 26, 2018, while it opened to the public on October 2, 2018. The museum houses over 3500 artworks, created by over 80 artists during the last 70 years.  The museum exhibits private art collection of the family of Dr. George (Gia) Jokhtaberidze and Manana Shevardadze, founders of Magticom, the largest telecommunications company in Georgia.

History 
Dr. George (Gia) Jokhtaberidze and Manana Shevardnadze started collecting art in 1990s. After successful entrepreneurial endeavors, Dr. Jokhtaberidze started buying art for personal interests. During one of the shopping visits, the gallery was about to ship art to a foreign country for very low prices. Soon Dr. Jokhtaberidze came to realize that if art was scattered around the world without proper collection, documentation and exhibition, art would be lost forever. Since most of the art was created during the Soviet Union and the Iron Curtain, the art was not yet well-known. Thus, the mission was born: to collect, restore and preserve Georgian art. In the beginning, the mission did not include the idea to build a completely new museum building, the idea was to collect and donate all the art to state museums. However, due to the collapse of the USSR and subsequent economic and civil turmoils, the state museums were left in dire situation and would not be able to accept all the art.

After collecting art for over 23 years and succeeding in leading the largest telecommunication company in Georgia, Dr. George Jokhtaberidze saw an opportunity to buy real estate right in front of the building of Parliament of Georgia. An opportunity was quickly turned into a plan to build a complex of buildings that would become the Georgian Museum of Fine Arts and the Art House.

Collections 
Artists

3rd Floor 

Levan Chogoshvili
Khuta Iremadze
Tato Akhalkatsishvili
Marina Eliozishvili
Ekaterine Abuladze
Ia Arsenishvili
Gia Gugushvili
Oleg Timchenko
Karaman Kutateladze
Davit Mindorashvili
Shalva Matuashvili
Levan Lagidze
Geno Zakaraia
Keti Davlianidze
Irakli Sutidze
Yuri Berishvili
Dali Podiashvili
Jemal Kukhalashvili
Tamaz Kakabadze
Gia Mirzashvili
Mamuka Tsetskhladze
Niko Tsetskhlazde
Nikoloz Shengelaia

4th Floor

Otar Chkhartishvili
Davit Monavardisashvili
Koki Makharadze
Zaal Bachanashvili
Eduard Shakhnazarov
Irakli Parjiani
Esma Oniani
Sergei Parajanov
Lev Baiakhchev
Omar Durmishidze
Davit Maisashvili
Tsira Kalandadze
Gaiane Khachaturyan
Mikheil Eristavi
Vladimer Kandelaki
Givi Toidze
Radish Tordia
Dimitri Eristavi
Gogi Chagelishvili
Givi Aghapishvili
Albert Dilbarian
Tamaz Khutsishvili
Tengiz Mirzashvili

5th Floor 

Edmond Kalandadze
Zurab Nijharadze
Levan Tsutskiridze
Jibson Khundadze
Temo Japaridze
Duda Gabashvili
Alexandre Bandzeladze
Ana Shalikashvili
Natalia Palavandishvili
Natela Iankoshvili
Qetevan Maghalashvili
Leopold Dzadzamidze
Elguja Amashukeli
Apolon Kutateladze

References

External links

Museums in Tbilisi
Art museums and galleries in Georgia (country)
Art museums established in 2018
2018 establishments in Georgia (country)